In the 2005–06 season, Trabzonspor finished in fourth place in the Süper Lig. The top scorer of the team was Fatih Tekke, who scored 28 goals.

This article shows statistics of the club's players and matches during the season.

Sponsor
Avea

01 Jefferson

03 Fabiano Eller

05 Hüseyin Cimsir

07 Miroslaw Szymkowiak

09 Fatih Tekke

10 Mehmet Hilmi Yilmaz

11 Ibrahima Yattara

13 Eul Young Lee

18 Tayfun Cora

19 Hasan Üçünçü

20 Yigit Gazi Kilinc

21 Tomas Jun

26 Hasan Sönmez

27 Caglar Birinci

29 Tolga Zengin

34 Emrah Eren

38 Erdinç Yavuz

47 Volkan Bekiroglu

61 Gökdeniz Karadeniz

66 Adem Koçak

99 Celaleddin Koçak

Süper Lig

Turkish Cup

See also
2005–06 Süper Lig
2005–06 Turkish Cup

References

Turkish football clubs 2005–06 season
Trabzonspor seasons